On May 9, 2005, video game developer Konami Corporation sued Roxor Games, developers of In the Groove, a video game similar to Konami’s pioneering Dance Dance Revolution. In the Groove could be purchased as a kit that needed to be plugged into a Dance Dance Revolution arcade machine in order to be used.

The initial complaint, filed in the U.S. District Court for the Eastern District of Texas, alleged patent infringement, federal trademark infringement, false advertising and unfair competition, trade dress infringement, and federal and state trademark dilution. An amended complaint by Konami filed on July 1, 2005 increased the scope of the lawsuit to encompass the home version of In the Groove as well as adding the publishers of the home version as defendants.

On August 7, 2006, the Court issued a Markman order construing the patent claims disputed by the parties. The meaning of the claims adopted by the court were, almost without exception, favorable to Konami, and a settlement of the litigation was announced on October 23, 2006. As a result of the settlement, Roxor Games transferred the intellectual property rights for In the Groove to Konami.

References

External links

2006 in United States case law
United States district court cases
United States patent case law